Giovannoni is a surname. Notable people with the surname include:

 Achille Giovannoni (1925–2014), French rower
 Guilherme Giovannoni (born 1980), Brazilian-Italian basketball player
 Jeanne M. Giovannoni professor
 Stephen J. Giovannoni, American microbiologist

See also
 Giovannini